Bloggie may refer to:

The Weblog Awards (Bloggies)
Sony Bloggie MHS-PM5 and Sony Bloggie MHS-CM5, video cameras by Sony